Samuel Jacob Farraway (born 1986) is an Australian politician. Farraway has served as the Minister for Regional Transport and Roads in the Perrottet ministry since December 2021. He has been a National member of the New South Wales Legislative Council since 17 October 2019, when he filled a casual vacancy caused by the resignation of Niall Blair.

Background
Farraway was born in Bathurst Base Hospital in 1986 to Warren and Leanne Farraway, and is the eldest of five children. Warren Farraway was involved in the automotive trade. In 1988, Warren and Leanne Farraway purchased a Hertz car rental franchise in Bathurst. Sam started to manage the family-run Hertz business in 2004. After operating for 30 years, the Farraway family sold the business in 2018.

For over 10 years prior to his appointment as a member of the Legislative Council, Farraway was the president of Bathurst Agricultural, Horticultural and Pastoral Association, which runs the annual Royal Bathurst Show.

In 2015 he won the young entrepreneur of the year at the Carillon Business Awards.

Political career
In 2007, Farraway met Kerry Bartlett, the then-federal Liberal MP for Macquarie, prior to the 2007 federal election. Farraway helped out in Bartlett's election campaign, by being the booth captain, packing booth kits, manning pre-polls, and had a picture of Barlett's face on his car for five weeks. Bartlett ultimately lost his seat at the election.

Three years later, in 2010, Farraway met John Cobb, the then-federal Nationals MP for Calare, prior to the 2010 federal election. Again, Farraway helped out with the election campaign and became the booth captain, performing the same tasks as he did for Bartlett's campaign. Cobb comfortably retained his seat in the election. In 2012, 18 months after the election, Farraway joined the Nationals after Cobb's recommendation.

After joining the Nationals, Farraway was the chair of the party's Bathurst branch, Bathurst State Electoral Council, Calare Federal Electorate Council, and a central executive member of the party. He was also the campaign manager for Cobb's election campaign in the 2013 federal election and for Paul Toole's election campaign in the 2019 New South Wales state election. , he is also the senior vice chair of the NSW Nationals.

Following Cobb's retirement in February 2016, Farraway unsuccessfully contested the Nationals' preselection for the federal seat of Calare for the 2016 federal election, who was contested by Andrew Gee instead. During the 2019 half-Senate election in May, Farraway contested unsuccessfully as a candidate for New South Wales in an unwinnable 5th position of the Coalition ticket.

In March 2019, Niall Blair announced his intention to resign from New South Wales Legislative Council and would do so when a replacement was found. Farraway won the party's preselection in September 2019 to fill Blair's upcoming vacancy. Blair resigned from the Council on 16 October 2019, and Farraway was appointed as a member of the Legislative Council the following day on 17 October 2019. In December 2021 Farrawway was sworn in as the Minister for Regional Transport and Roads in the Perrottet ministry.

References

 

Living people
Members of the New South Wales Legislative Council
National Party of Australia members of the Parliament of New South Wales
21st-century Australian politicians
1986 births